A flak corps was a massed anti-aircraft (AA) artillery formation employed by the Luftwaffe for anti-aircraft, antitank, and fire support operations in World War II. A Flakkorps was a flexible organization that was made up of a varying number of AA regiments, brigades, or divisions. A total of six flak corps were organized by Germany during the war. The flak corps, while mainly intended to support ground units with concentrated anti-aircraft fire, in many cases provided also antitank support.

History
Flak corps did not exist before World War II. Until the end of war Germany eventually organized a total of six flak corps, being numbered I - VI, plus one short-lived special flak corps.

Flak corps I and II were formed on 3 October 1939. They grouped previously existing mobile AA battalions so as to overwhelmingly concentrate their firepower at points of decision on the battlefield. The original two flak corps were used in the Battle of France in 1940, and later inactivated. They were reorganized for the German invasion of Russia and fought for the remainder of the war on the Eastern Front. The I Flak Corps was destroyed at Stalingrad and later formed again.

The III Flak Corps was formed in February 1944 and fought on the Western Front. In total, III Flak Corps entered combat in Normandy with 27 heavy batteries, 26 light batteries and some 12,000 men. During the fighting in Normandy in 1944, the III Flak Corps was motorized although not all authorized vehicles were present. It was eventually destroyed in the Ruhr Pocket in April 1945.

The IV Flak Corps was formed in July 1944 and supported Army Group G on the Western Front until it surrendered in May 1945.

The V Flak Corps was formed in November 1944 and fought in Hungary and Austria.

The VI Flak Corps was formed in February 1945 and fought in northern Germany in support of the 1st Parachute Army.

The flak corps "for special employment" (Flakkorps z.b.V.) was organized in 1945 to control V-weapons.

Organization
Flak corps were large organizations of pre-existing AA units (regiments, brigades, and divisions) rather than being formed as new units from scratch. In 1943 Allied intelligence noted:

The Flak Corps is a wartime organization, and constitutes an operational reserve of the commander in chief of the German Air Force. It combines great mobility with heavy fire power. It can be employed in conjunction with spearheads composed of armored and motorized forces, and with nonmotorized troops in forcing river crossings and attacking fortified positions. It can also be deployed as highly mobile artillery to support tank attacks.

Flak corps did not include the majority of the Germany's flak force. Even considering only the Luftwaffe's flak units dedicated to direct support of Wehrmacht ground troops, most of them were not subordinated to flak corps.

Flak corps were either partially motorized or fully motorized, depending on the degree of motorization of their subordinate units.

The following orders of battle depict typical flak corps organizations in 1940 and 1944:

II Flak Corps, August 1, 1940:
Flak Regiment 103 with three mixed AA battalions and two light AA battalions
Flak Regiment 201 with three mixed AA battalions and one light AA battalion
Flak Regiment 202 with three mixed AA battalions and one light AA battalion

III Flak Corps, June 6, 1944:
Flak-Sturm Regiment 1 with two mixed AA battalions
Flak-Sturm Regiment 2 with two mixed AA battalions and one light AA battalion
Flak-Sturm Regiment 3 with two mixed AA battalions and one light AA battalion
Flak-Sturm Regiment 4 with three mixed AA battalions and one light AA battalion

Assessment
Although the AA guns of all nations in World War II could be used against ground targets, Germany in particular used AA guns in multiple roles. The need for command and control of these assets led to the organization of larger units, culminating with the organization of flak corps. Although the Soviets also organized large air defense units, they were typically not used against ground targets. The flak corps above all provided additional antitank support for the German ground forces. In some cases, such as at Cagny in Normandy, these units achieved significant success against attacking Allied armored vehicles. The use of flak corps as ground warfare assets was complicated because they were part of the air force (Luftwaffe) chain of command even when supporting ground forces (either Heer or Waffen SS).

Given the expense of producing AA guns – in relation to the cost of antitank guns of the same capabilities – it is questionable if their use as antitank weapons was economical.

As an organizational form, massed AA-gun formations represented a dead-end as large-caliber AA guns were phased out of military service in the 1950s and replaced by surface to air missiles.

Footnotes

References
Zetterling on III Flak Corps
"Tactical Employment of Flak in the Field" from Intelligence Bulletin, November 1943  at LoneSentry.com
The Luftwaffe, 1933-1945
Luftwaffe airborne and field units By Martin Windrow
Tessin, Georg, Verbände und Truppen der deutschen Wehrmacht und Waffen-SS 1939 - 1945, Osnabrück: Biblio Verlag, 1979. .
Werrell, Kenneth P. Archie to SAM, Maxwell AFB: Air University Press, 2005.  Accessible on-line here.

Artillery units and formations of Germany
Military units and formations of the Luftwaffe
Air defence corps